The Mihail Kogălniceanu University is a private university in Iaşi, Romania. Founded in 1990, it was named in honor of the Romanian historian and statesman Mihail Kogălniceanu.

Structure
Faculties
 Faculty of Law
 Faculty of Communication and Public Relations

References

External links
 Official site

Kogalniceanu
Educational institutions established in 1990
1990 establishments in Romania